Eulepidotis santosina is a moth of the family Erebidae first described by George Hampson in 1926. It is found in the Neotropics, including the Brazilian state of São Paulo.

References

Moths described in 1926
santosina